Kristóf Milák (born 20 February 2000) is a Hungarian swimmer. He is the current holder of the world record in the long course 200 metre butterfly and the European record in the long course 100 metre butterfly. He also currently holds the Hungarian record in the short course 50 metre backstroke. At his first Olympic Games, the 2020 Summer Olympics, he won a gold medal in the 200 metre butterfly and a silver medal in the 100 metre butterfly. He has also won three gold medals and one silver at the World Aquatic Championships, as well as three gold medals at the European Aquatics Championships. He was the gold medalist in the 400 metre freestyle, 200 metre freestyle, and 200 metre butterfly events at the 2018 Summer Youth Olympics.

Career

2016
When he was 16 years old, Milák competed at the 2016 European Junior Swimming Championships in Hódmezővásárhely, Hungary in July, winning the gold medal in the 200 metre butterfly with a time of 1:56.77, placing fifth in the 100 metre butterfly at 52.98 seconds, and placing seventh with a time of 24.42 seconds in the 50 metre butterfly.

2017: Butterfly lift-off

2017 European Junior Championships
At the 2017 European Junior Swimming Championships in Netanya, Israel, Milák swam a 1:53.79 in the 200 metre butterfly, winning the gold medal and setting a new world junior record and a new Championships record in the event.

2017 World Championships

At the 2017 World Aquatics Championships in Budapest, Milák set a new world junior record and a new Hungarian national record of 50.77 seconds in the semifinals of the 100 metre butterfly. Earlier the same day, in the prelims of the same event, he broke his first world junior record of the Championships with a time of 51.23 seconds. In the final he swam a 50.62 and won the silver medal, setting a his third world junior record and second national record in the event. In addition to his national records in the 100 metre butterfly, Milák helped the Hungary 4x100 metre medley relay place seventh in the final and set a new national record of 3:32.13.

2017 World Junior Championships
On 26 August 2017, at the 2017 FINA World Junior Swimming Championships in Indianapolis, United States, Milák helped set a new world junior record and Championships record of 7:10.95 in the final of the 4x200 metre freestyle relay.

2018: A year golden in fly and free

2018 Spring National and European Junior Championships
At the 2018 Hungarian Spring National Championships, Milák, who was just 18 years of age, lowered his own world junior record in the 200 metre butterfly to a 1:52.71. In July, at the 2018 European Junior Swimming Championships, Milák competed in 10 individual and relay events, reaching the semifinal or final in all 10 events, swimming in the final of 9 events, and winning medals in 5 events, of which four were gold medals and one was a bronze medal.

2018 European Championships

At the 2018 European Aquatics Championships held in Glasgow, Scotland in August, he won the gold medal in the 200 metre butterfly event with a time of 1:52.79. In the mixed 4x200 metre freestyle relay, he led-off the relay swimming a 1:48.04 for the first leg and helping the relay place fourth with a Hungarian national record time of 7:31.19.

2018 Summer Youth Olympics

Milák won a total of four medals at the 2018 Summer Youth Olympics in Buenos Aires, Argentina in October 2018, three of which were gold medals and one of which was a silver medal. In the 400 metre freestyle Milák won his first gold medal with a time of 3:48.08, finishing almost half a second before silver medalist Marco De Tullio of Italy and splitting under 30 seconds at every 50 meter mark of the race. His second gold medal of the Youth Olympic Games came in the 200 metre freestyle where he was the only swimmer under 1:48.00, winning in a time of 1:47.73. He won his third gold medal in a butterfly event, the 200 metre butterfly, where he finished exactly 1.00 seconds ahead of second place finisher Denys Kesil of the Ukraine with a time of 1:54.89. In the 100 metre butterfly, Milák won his only silver medal of the meet, ranking second in the final behind Andrei Minakov of Russia with a time of 51.50 seconds.

2018 Winter National Championships
Once back to Hungary from the Summer Youth Olympics, Milák set a new national record in the short course 50 metre backstroke with a time of 23.49 seconds on 10 November 2018 at the 2018 Hungarian Winter National Championships conducted in short course metres.

2019: Toppling a decade-old world record

2019 World Championships

At the 2019 World Aquatics Championships held in Gwangju, South Korea in July 2019, Milák won the gold medal and set a new world record of 1:50.73 in the 200 metre butterfly on 24 July, breaking Michael Phelps' 10-year-old world record by 0.78 seconds. In addition to breaking the world record set by Phelps in 2009, Milák became the first person to hold the world record in the men's long course 200 metre butterfly event other than Phelps in an 18 year period. It was also the first time in almost a decade that any swimmer had a long course world record in a butterfly event at either the 100 metre or 200 metre distance other than Phelps, with the last swimmer being Milorad Čavić of Serbia in the 100 metre butterfly in 2009.

International Swimming League
In 2019, Milák was member of the 2019 International Swimming League representing Team Iron. He won the 200m butterfly in both matches he participated in. (Lewisville, Budapest)

2020: COVID-19 sidelines Milák

International Swimming League
Due to a positive test of having COVID-19, Milák was unable to participate in the 2020 International Swimming League at full capacity, he was on the roster of Team Iron though was out of the season.

2021: Milák springs back

2021 Spring National Championships
At the long course 2021 Hungarian Spring National Championships in Budapest, Milák set his first national record of the Championships in the 100 metre freestyle by dropping over eight tenths of a second off his best time to set the new record at 48.00 seconds, which was eight hundredths of a second faster than the previous record. Milák also broke the 100 metre butterfly national record he set in 2017 at 50.62 seconds with a new personal best time of 50.47 seconds. He also anchored the 4x200 metre freestyle relay with a split of 1:44.86, helping the relay set a new national record of 7:07.67 in the event.

2020 European Championships

At the 2020 European Aquatics Championships in Budapest, Milák won his first gold medal in Championships record time in the 200 metre butterfly, which was the second gold medal for Hungary and first gold medal for a male Hungarian in any sport at the Championships. He also won the gold medal in the 100 metre butterfly with a national record and Championships record time of 50.18 seconds in the final after achieving Championships records in both the prelims and semifinals of the event.

2020 Summer Olympics

At the 2020 Summer Olympics in Tokyo, Japan and postponed to 2021 due to the COVID-19 pandemic, Milák won the gold medal in the 200 metre butterfly in a new Olympic record time of 1:51.25. He finished over one body length ahead of and more than two seconds before the second place finisher and silver medalist, Japan's Tomoru Honda. In the semifinals of the 100 metre butterfly, Milák broke the Olympic record of 50.39 set by Caeleb Dressel of the United States in the prelims heats and set a new Olympic record of 50.31 seconds. He won the silver medal with a time of 49.68 in the final, less than three tenths of a second slower than the first place finisher. His time of 49.68 seconds in the final set a new European record and Hungarian record in the event and moved him up in global rankings to second fastest swimmer in the event internationally, ahead of Michael Phelps and behind Caeleb Dressel. In addition to his butterfly individual events, Milák swam in the prelims and finals of the 4x100 meter freestyle relay, helping the relay finish fifth and set a new Hungarian record in the final.

International Swimming League
Milák was selected as one of the swimmers for Team Iron in the 2021 International Swimming League, which was the third season of the International Swimming League.

2021 Swimming World Cup: Budapest

On the first day of the 2021 FINA Swimming World Cup stop in Budapest and held in short course metres, 7 October, Milák advanced to the final of the 100 metre butterfly with a time of 50.60 seconds. He also advanced to the final of the 50 metre freestyle, with a new personal best time of 21.62 seconds. Later in the day during the finals session, Milák swam a personal best time in the 100 metre butterfly at 49.92 seconds and won the silver medal in the event behind Tom Shields of the United States. In the final of the 50 metre freestyle, Milák lowered his time from the prelims by almost two tenths of a second to 21.44 seconds and ranked fifth overall.

Starting off day two of competition in the morning, Milák swam a personal best time of 23.34 in the 50 metre backstroke, breaking the Hungarian national record of 23.39 in the event, and advancing to the final ranked first overall. To conclude his morning prelims session, Milák qualified for the final of the 100 metre freestyle ranked sixth overall with his time of 47.48 seconds. He dropped over two tenths of a second in the final of the 50 metre backstroke in the evening, winning the gold medal and setting a new national record of 23.08 seconds. Transitioning to freestyle for his last two events of the day, he broke 47 seconds for the first time in the 100 metre freestyle final and won the bronze medal with a time of 46.93 seconds, finishing within two seconds of gold medalist Kyle Chalmers of Australia and silver medalist Vladimir Morozov of Russia. In his third and final event of the day two finals session, the mixed 4x50 metre freestyle relay, Milák split a 20.94, helping his relay win the silver medal in a time of 1:32.44.

The final morning of competition in Budapest, Milák advanced to the final in both of the events he raced. Up first, in the 50 metre butterfly, he qualified ranked third for the final with his prelims time of 22.91 seconds. About an hour later, in the prelims of the 200 metre freestyle, he swam within a second of his best time at 1:45.62 and advanced to the final ranked sixth. Milák just missed the podium in the final of the 50 metre butterfly, finishing fourth with a personal best time of 22.64 seconds. In the final of the 200 metre freestyle, he swam another personal best time, dropping over two full seconds from his previous best time of 1:44.91 to win the bronze medal with a time of 1:42.61. In terms of total points scored for his swims at the Budapest stop, Milák ranked fifth amongst male competitors, in terms of total points earned across all four World Cup stops, for which Milák only competed at the one Budapest stop, Milák's scores from the one stop were good enough to rank him as 35th overall highest scoring male competitor, and amongst male competitors who competed at only one stop in the World Cup circuit Milák ranked as number five in terms of total points.

2021 European Short Course Championships

To follow-up his short course performances at the World Cup, Milák entered to compete at the 2021 European Short Course Swimming Championships held at the Kazan Aquatics Palace in Russia starting on 2 November. He diversified his line-up with five events spanning three different strokes, entering to race in the 50 metre backstroke, 100 metre butterfly, 200 meter butterfly, 100 metre freestyle, and 200 metre freestyle.

On 2 November, day one of competition, Milák qualified for the semifinals of the 50 metre backstroke with his time of 23.91 seconds, which was a little over four tenths of a second behind Simone Sabbioni of Italy who competed in the same prelims heat and did not qualify for the semifinals as he was not one of the fastest two swimmers in the prelims heats from his country. Later in the same prelims session, Milák advanced to the semifinals later the same day in his second event, the 100 metre butterfly, with a time of 50.39 seconds. For the semifinals of the 50 metre backstroke, he swam a 23.50, qualifying for the final ranked eighth. His last race of day one, the semifinals of the 100 metre butterfly, Milák swam a personal best time of 49.71 seconds and advanced to the final ranking second. The following day, Milák placed eighth in the final of the 50 metre backstroke with a time of 23.34 seconds. In the final of the 100 metre butterfly, he just missed the podium, finishing in fourth place with a time of 49.88 seconds.

In the prelims of the 200 metre butterfly on the morning of day three, Milák qualified for the semifinals with a time of 1:54.32. He swam a 1:51.33 in the semifinals and qualified for the final the following day ranked first. The next day, Milák decided not to swim in the prelims heats of the 200 metre freestyle, resting for the final of the 200 metre butterfly in the evening. Later in the day, during the evening finals session, he won his first medal at a European Short Course Swimming Championships, earning the gold medal in the 200 metre butterfly with a time of 1:51.11 in the final of the event. On the fifth day, Milák swam a near-best time of 47.16 seconds in the 100 metre freestyle prelims heats and advanced to the semifinals ranking tenth amongst the swimmers who qualified for the semifinals and fourteenth overall. He followed up his morning time with a 47.08 in the evening semifinals, placing ninth and earning the designation of alternate for the final.

2022

2022 World Championships

At the 2022 World Aquatics Championships in Budapest in June and July, Milák split the second-fastest time of all finals relays swimmers in the 4×100 metre freestyle relay with a time of 46.89 seconds to help place fifth in 3:11.24. Three days later, in the final of the 200 metre butterfly, he lowered his own world record in the event to a 1:50.34 and won the gold medal, finishing 3.03 seconds ahead of the silver medalist Léon Marchand of France. Swimming the anchor leg of the 4×200 metre freestyle relay in the final two days later, he split a 1:44.68 to help achieve a time of 7:06.27 and fifth-place finish. The following day, he won a gold medal in the 100 metre butterfly with a time of 50.14 seconds, finishing eight-tenths of a second ahead of silver medalist Naoki Mizunuma of Japan.

2022 European Aquatics Championships

For the 2022 European Aquatics Championships, held in August in Rome, Italy, Milák entered to compete in the 100 metre freestyle, 200 metre freestyle, 100 metre butterfly, and 200 metre butterfly individual events. On the first day of competition, he won a gold medal in the 4×200 metre freestyle relay, splitting a 1:44.42 for the anchor leg of the relay to contribute to the final mark, and new Hungarian record, of 7:05.38. The next day he qualified for the semifinals of the 100 metre freestyle, ranking twelfth in the preliminaries with a time of 48.88 seconds. In the semifinals, he swam a personal best time of 47.76 seconds, qualifying for the final ranking second by two-tenths of a second ahead of third-ranked Alessandro Miressi of Italy. Day three, he started off with a 51.82 in the preliminaries of the 100 metre butterfly, qualifying for the semifinals ranking third. Starting off the evening session, he won the silver medal in the 100 metre freestyle with a Hungarian record time of 47.47 seconds. Finishing off the session, he swam a 51.01 in the semifinals of the 100 metre butterfly, qualifying for the final ranking first.

Day four, Milák ranked first in the morning prelims heats of the 200 metre freestyle, qualifying for the semifinals with a time of 1:46.26. Later in the morning session, he anchored the 4×100 metre freestyle relay with a 48.84 to help qualify the relay to the final ranking first. Starting off the evening session, he won the gold medal in the 100 metre butterfly with a time of 50.33 seconds. Approximately 15 minutes later, he placed tenth in the semifinals of the 200 metre freestyle with a time of 1:47.37. About an hour after that, he won a silver medal in the 4×100 metre freestyle relay, splitting a 47.24 for the anchor leg of the relay to help finish in 3:12.43. In the preliminaries of the 200 metre butterfly the next morning, he swam a 1:54.97 and qualified for the semifinals ranking first. He sped up to a 1:53.97 in the semifinals to qualify for the final ranking first. He won his third gold medal of the Championships the following day, finishing first in the 200 metre butterfly with a time of 1:52.01, which was 2.77 seconds ahead of silver medalist and fellow Hungarian Richárd Márton.

International championships (50 m)

International championships (25 m)

Personal best times

Long course metres (50 m pool)

Short course metres (25 m pool)

Swimming World Cup circuits
The following medals Milák has won at Swimming World Cup circuits.

World records

World junior records

Long course metres (50 m pool)

World records

Long course metres (50 m pool)

Continental and national records

Long course metres (50 m pool)

Short course metres (25 m pool)

Awards
 SwimSwam, Top 100 (Men's): 2021 (#9), 2022 (#5)
 Swimming World, Newcomer of the Year: 2017

See also
 List of Youth Olympic Games gold medalists who won Olympic gold medals
 List of junior world records in swimming
 List of European records in swimming
 List of world records in swimming
 World record progression 200 metres butterfly

References

External links

Individual statistics, Milák Kristóf at the-sports.org
MILAK, Kristof (2000) at swimrankings.net

2000 births
Living people
Hungarian male swimmers
Swimmers from Budapest
World Aquatics Championships medalists in swimming
Male butterfly swimmers
European Aquatics Championships medalists in swimming
Swimmers at the 2018 Summer Youth Olympics
World record holders in swimming
Youth Olympic gold medalists for Hungary
Medalists at the 2020 Summer Olympics
Olympic gold medalists in swimming
Olympic gold medalists for Hungary
Swimmers at the 2020 Summer Olympics
21st-century Hungarian people